Péter Kovács (born 7 February 1978) is a Hungarian former professional footballer played as a forward for Újpest and Vác in Hungary, for Lahti and Haka in Finland, for Tromsø, Viking, Strømsgodset, Odd Grenland, Sarpsborg 08, Sandefjord and Arendal in Norway, and for Lierse in Belgium.

Club career
Kovács was born in Salgótarján, Hungary. When playing for FC Haka he scored a goal against Liverpool in the 2001–02 Champions League qualifyings. Kovács gained notoriety in August 2009, when in the quarter-finals of the Norwegian Cup, he scored a goal against SK Brann after Brann's keeper fell to the ground with an injured knee while trying to clear the ball upfield following a home pass. He also came one goal short of being joint top scorer in the 2009 Norwegian premier league, finishing behind Rade Prica.

He became the top scorer in the 2012 Norwegian premier league, and won the league with Strømsgodset in 2013, during his second spell at the club. On 21 July 2015, he signed a five-month deal with for Sarpsborg 08 on a free transfer. On 10 November 2015, he signed a one-year deal with newly relegated Sandefjord in the Norwegian First Division.

Personal life
Kovács has a relationship with Norwegian female footballer, Melissa Wiik.

He speaks Hungarian, English and Norwegian fluently.

Career statistics

Club

International goal
Score and result list Hungary's goal tally first, score column indicates score after Kovács goal.

Honours
FC Haka
 Finnish Championship: 2000
 Finnish Cup: 2002

Strømsgodset
 Norwegian Championship: 2013

Individual
Norwegian Cup Top goalscorer: 2012
 Norwegian Premier League top goalscorer: 2012
 Norwegian First Division top goalscorer: 2008

References

External links
 
 
 

1978 births
Living people
People from Salgótarján
Hungarian footballers
Association football forwards
Hungary international footballers
Nemzeti Bajnokság II players
Veikkausliiga players
Eliteserien players
Norwegian First Division players
Belgian Pro League players
Újpest FC players
Vác FC players
FC Lahti players
FC Haka players
Tromsø IL players
Viking FK players
Strømsgodset Toppfotball players
Odds BK players
Lierse S.K. players
Sarpsborg 08 FF players
Sandefjord Fotball players
Arendal Fotball players
Hungarian expatriate footballers
Hungarian expatriate sportspeople in Belgium
Expatriate footballers in Belgium
Expatriate footballers in Finland
Hungarian expatriate sportspeople in Finland
Expatriate footballers in Norway
Hungarian expatriate sportspeople in Norway
Sportspeople from Nógrád County